In computing, Oracle Coherence (originally Tangosol Coherence) is a Java-based distributed cache and in-memory data grid. It is claimed to be "intended for systems that require high availability, high scalability and low latency, particularly in cases when traditional relational database management systems provide insufficient throughput, or insufficient performance."

History 
Tangosol Coherence was created by Cameron Purdy and Gene Gleyzer, and initially released in December, 2001.

Oracle Corporation acquired Tangosol Inc., the original owner of the product, in April 2007, at which point it had more than 100 direct customers. Tangosol Coherence was also embedded in a number of other companies' software products, some of which belonged to Oracle Corporation's competitors.

Features

Coherence provides a variety of mechanisms to integrate with other services using TopLink, Java Persistence API, Oracle Golden Gate and other platforms using APIs provided by Coherence.

Coherence can be used to manage HTTP sessions via Coherence*Web, in which application services such as Oracle WebLogic Server, IBM WebSphere, Apache Tomcat and others are claimed to get the same performance, fault tolerance, and scalability as data.

In the summer of 2020, Coherence Community Edition was released as open source on GitHub. Some Coherence usage patterns are also open source and are listed and supported through the Oracle Coherence incubator. These patterns implement features such as messaging, work distribution and data replication across wide area networks with Coherence.

See also 
 Complex event processing
 Distributed computing
 Distributed hash table
 Distributed transaction processing
 Extreme transaction processing
 Grid computing
Transaction processing

References

External links 
 Oracle Coherence Product page
 Open source Coherence Community Edition project
 Oracle Coherence User Forum
 Weblogic Coherence
 The Oracle Coherence Knowledge Base
 The Oracle Coherence v10 incubator page
 Oracle Coherence 3.5 by  Aleksander Seovic, Packt Press

Oracle software
Transaction processing
Storage software
Proprietary software